USS LST-316 was one of 390 tank landing ships (LSTs) built for the United States Navy during World War II.

LST-316 was laid down on 15 October 1942 at the New York Navy Yard in Brooklyn, New York; launched on 28 January 1943; sponsored by Mrs. Pearl Magdalene Frick; and commissioned on 3 February 1943.

Service history
During World War II, LST-316 was assigned to the European theater and participated in the Sicilian occupation (July 1943), Salerno landings (September 1943), and Invasion of Normandy (June 1944).

Upon her return to the United States, she was decommissioned on 24 May 1945 for conversion to landing craft repair ship USS Cerberus (ARL-43) at New York Navy Yard. The conversion was canceled 12 September 1945 and the ship reverted to LST-316; she was struck from the Naval Vessel Register on 12 March 1946. On 23 December 1946 she was sold to James Hughes, Inc. of New York, New York for conversion to merchant service.
 
LST-316 earned three battle stars for World War II service.

References

See also
 List of United States Navy LSTs

World War II amphibious warfare vessels of the United States
Ships built in Brooklyn
1943 ships
LST-1-class tank landing ships of the United States Navy